Dragonborn may refer to:

 Dragonborn (Dungeons & Dragons), a Draconic race from the Dungeons & Dragons role playing game
 Dragonborn, a player character in The Elder Scrolls V: Skyrim who has the blood and soul of a dragon
 The Elder Scrolls V: Skyrim – Dragonborn, an expansion set for Skyrim
 "Dragonborn" (song), a song by Jeremy Soule as the theme song for Skyrim
 "Dragonborn", a cover of the Jeremy Soule song by Headhunterz from the album Sacrifice
 Dragonborn, musician who performed the opening theme song "The Words" on the television show Dicte